Eldon Dedini (June 29, 1921 – January 12, 2006) was an American cartoonist whose work appeared in Esquire, The New Yorker, Playboy and elsewhere.

Life

Dedini was born in King City, California, on June 29, 1921; his father was a dairy farmer, his mother a schoolteacher. He studied at Salinas Junior College, where Leon Amyx was on the teaching staff, and then at the Chouinard Art Institute in Los Angeles. There he met Virginia Conroy; they were married on July 15, 1944. They adopted a baby boy called john in 1960.

Dedini died at his home in Carmel, California, on January 12, 2006 at the age of 84.

Exhibitions
  Broccoli & Babes: The Cartoons and Posters of Eldon Dedini: November 4, 2005—January 20, 2006 at the Sasoontsi Gallery, Salinas, Calif.
  Monterey Museum of Art "Arriola, Dedini, Ketchum" 1982

Awards
He received the National Cartoonists Society's Gag Cartoon Award in 1958, 1961, 1964 and 1988.

Bibliography

 Illustrations for Bantam Books editions of Max Shulman works:
Rally Round the Flag, Boys!, (1958) (1959)
Barefoot Boy with Cheek (1959)
Sleep Till Noon (1959)
I Was a Teen-Age Dwarf (1960)
The Feather Merchants
Anyone Got a Match (1965)
 The Dedini Gallery. Holt, Rinehart and Winston, New York (1961)
 A Much, Much Better World.  Microsoft Press, Bellevue WA (1985)
Fantagraphics Books published a posthumous collection of his work, An Orgy of Playboy's Eldon Dedini in 2006. Introduction by political cartoonist Dennis Renault. The book is bundled with a documentary "Dedini:  A Life of Cartoons" by Anson Musselman.

References

Sources
 American National Biography Online
 New York Times report of death Retrieved January 14, 2006
 Monterey Herald obituary Retrieved January 14, 2006 (reprinted at emdashes.com
 "Broccoli and Babes," an article by Ben Bamsey in Artworks (winter 2005): 58-63
 Dedini's papers and original art are archived at the Cartoon Research Library at Ohio State University, which also has on file a videotape of his presentation at the 2001 Festival of Cartoon Art, sponsored by the Cartoon Research Library, during which Dedini showed slides of his cartoons and commented on them, offering a description of his working methods and attitudes.

External links
NCS Awards
ASIFA: Hollywood Animation Archive
cartoons published in the New Yorker

1921 births
2006 deaths
American cartoonists
Deaths from esophageal cancer
Deaths from cancer in California
Esquire (magazine) people
The New Yorker cartoonists
People from King City, California
Playboy cartoonists
People from Carmel-by-the-Sea, California